The Prophet from Pugwash is a Canadian documentary film, directed by Carol Moore-Ede and released in 1977. The film is a portrait of Cyrus Eaton, the Canadian financier most noted for convening the annual Pugwash Conferences on Science and World Affairs.

The film was broadcast by CBC Television on November 9, 1977.

The film received a Canadian Film Award nomination for Best Feature Length Documentary at the 29th Canadian Film Awards in 1978.

References

External links
 

1977 films
1977 documentary films
1977 television films
Canadian documentary television films
CBC Television original films
Documentary films about businesspeople
1970s English-language films
1970s Canadian films